De Banten-bode ("The Banten Messenger") was a Dutch-language newspaper published in Serang, Dutch Indies (present-day Indonesia). De Banten-bode was published between 1924 and 1938, and possibly later.

External links
Archive at Royal Library

References

Dutch-language newspapers
Defunct newspapers published in Indonesia
1924 establishments in the Dutch East Indies
Newspapers established in 1924
Mass media in Serang